Janus Henderson is a British-American global asset management group headquartered in the City of London, United Kingdom. It offers a range of financial products to individuals, intermediary advisors and institutional investors globally under the trade name Janus Henderson Investors.

The group's holding company, Janus Henderson Group plc, is incorporated in Jersey and is dual-listed on the New York Stock Exchange and the Australian Securities Exchange (where it is a component of the S&P/ASX 100 index).

History
Janus Henderson was formed from the all stock merger of Janus Capital Group and Henderson Group which completed in May 2017. At the time of the merger, the combined group had assets under management of US$360.5 billion.

Operations
The company manages mutual funds and ETFs in five asset classes: Equities, Quantitative Equities, Alternatives, Fixed Income and Multi-Asset.

References

External links
 

Investment management companies of the United Kingdom
Companies listed on the Australian Securities Exchange
Companies listed on the New York Stock Exchange
Companies of Jersey
2017 establishments in England
Financial services companies established in 2017